Sociedad Deportiva Ceuta was a Spanish football team based in the autonomous city of Ceuta. Founded in 1932 and dissolved in 1956, it held home matches at Estadio Alfonso Murube, with a capacity of 6,500.

History
SD Ceuta was founded in 1932, after a merger of Ceuta FC and Cultural SC, under the name of Ceuta SC. It first played in Segunda División in 1939, being relegated but immediately returning the following season.

The club enjoyed a five-year spell in the second division from 1941 to 1946. Another four campaigns in Tercera División followed, and after a one-year spell in Segunda in 1950–51, the club spent five seasons in the third division before merging with Atlético Tetuán to form Atlético Ceuta.

Club background
Ceuta Sport Club — (1932-41); renamed in 1941 to Sociedad Deportiva Ceuta
Sociedad Deportiva Ceuta — (1941-56); in 1956 merged with the Spanish elements of Club Atlético Tetuán to form Club Atlético de Ceuta

Other clubs from Ceuta
Club Atlético de Ceuta — (1956–); renamed in 2013 to Agrupación Deportiva Ceuta Fútbol Club
Club Deportivo Imperio de Ceuta — (1958–)
Agrupación Deportiva Ceuta — (1969–91)
Club Ceutí Atlético – (1996–97)
Asociación Deportiva Ceuta – (1997–2012)
Agrupación Deportiva Ceuta Fútbol Club — (2013–)

Season to season

As Ceuta SC

As SD Ceuta

7 seasons in Segunda División
10 seasons in Tercera División

External links
ArefePedia team profile 

Football clubs in Ceuta
Association football clubs established in 1932
Association football clubs disestablished in 1956
Defunct football clubs in Spain
1932 establishments in Spain
1956 disestablishments in Spain
Segunda División clubs